As Orfas refers to a group of baroque buildings in Santiago de Compostela, Province of A Coruña, Galicia, Spain.

References

Buildings and structures in Santiago de Compostela
Baroque architecture in Spain